Apulum, officially S.C. Apulum S.A. is a manufacturer of porcelain products, founded in Alba Iulia in 1970. It is Romania's largest porcelain producer and one of the main European exporters.

Quality policies and standards
ISO 9001:1994
ISO 9001:2000
SR ISO 6486/1 
SR ISO 6484/2

See also
 Porcelain manufacturing companies in Europe

References

External links 
 

Ceramics manufacturers
Manufacturing companies of Romania
Manufacturing companies established in 1970
Alba Iulia
Privatized companies in Romania
Romanian brands
1970 establishments in Romania
Companies of Alba County